Czech Lion Award for Best Director is an annual award given to the best Czech film director of the year.

Winners

External links

Awards for best director
Czech Lion Awards
Awards established in 1993